Sphincterochila cariosula is a species of air-breathing land snail, a terrestrial pulmonate gastropod mollusk in the family Sphincterochilidae.

Subspecies 
 Sphincterochila cariosula cariosula (Michaud, 1833)
 Sphincterochila cariosula hispanica (Westerlund, 1891) - synonym Helix hispanica. The subspecies is distributed in Spain.

Distribution 
The indigenous distribution of the species is Algeria. The species was introduced to Vélez-Málaga in southern Spain and to western Mallorca in historical times.

Shell description 
The shell is subimperforate, carinate, globosely convex above, carious, somewhat flattened below, soiled white, with a tubercularly eroded filiform sutural carina. The shell has 5 somewhat flattened whorls. The upper margin of the aperture is subdeflected. The width of the shell is 16–19 mm and the height is 11–15 mm.

Habitat 
Sphincterochila cariosula occurs in scrublands and in semideserts.

References 
This article incorporates public domain text from reference.

 Bank, R. A.; Neubert, E. (2017). Checklist of the land and freshwater Gastropoda of Europe. Last update: July 16th, 2017

External links 
 Photo of Sphincterochila cariosula hispanica

Sphincterochilidae
Gastropods described in 1833